The Klyazma (Klyaz'ma), a river in the Moscow, Nizhny Novgorod, Ivanovo and Vladimir Oblasts in Russia, forms a left tributary of the Oka.

The Klyazma usually freezes up in November and stays under the ice until mid-April, although in faster-moving stretches ice-free water occurs until the air temperature drops below .

The largest tributaries of the Klyazma include (from source to mouth):

 Ucha (left)
 Vorya (left)
 Sherna (left)
 Kirzhach (left)
 Peksha (left)
 Polya (right)
 Koloksha (left)
 Nerl (left)
 Sudogda (right)
 Nerekhta (right)
 Uvod (left)
 Teza (left)
 Lukh (left)
 Suvoroshch (right)

The Klyazma is navigable within  from its estuary and in the area of the Klyazminskoye Reservoir. The cities of  Gorokhovets,  Mendeleyevo, Pavlovsky Posad,  Vladimir, Kovrov, Shchyolkovo, Losino-Petrovsky, Noginsk, Orekhovo-Zuyevo, Sobinka and Vyazniki stand on the shores of the Klyazma River.

The basin of the Klyazma formed the center of the  Vladimir-Suzdal principality in the 12th to 14th centuries CE.

References

Rivers of Moscow Oblast
Rivers of Vladimir Oblast
Rivers of Nizhny Novgorod Oblast
Rivers of Ivanovo Oblast